The 2011–12 Union Dutchwomen women's hockey team will represent Union College in the 2011–12 NCAA Division I women's ice hockey season. The Dutchwomen are a member of the Eastern College Athletic Conference.

Offseason

Recruiting

Exhibition

East West Showcase

Regular season
November 4, 2011: Emilie Arseneault scored a short handed goal late into the second period to give the Dutchwomen a 2-1 conference victory over the Clarkson Golden Knights women's ice hockey program. It was the Dutchwomen's first ECAC win since the 2009-2010 season, and only their second ECAC win since 2004.

Standings

Schedule

Conference record

Awards and honors
 Kate Gallagher, ECAC Goaltender of the Week (Week of November 7, 2011)
 Stefanie Thomson, ECAC Player of the Week (Week of October 10, 2011)
 Christiner Valente, ECAC Rookie of the Week (Week of October 24, 2011)

Team awards
Kate Gallagher, George Morrison Most Valuable Player Award for the second consecutive year. 
Dania Simmonds received the Ashley Kilstein Award for community service
Dania Simmonds, Coaches' Award. 
Stefanie Thomson and freshman Alex Tancrell-Fontaine, Most Improved Player Award (tie)
Christine Valente was named Rookie of the Year

See also
2009–10 Union Dutchwomen women's ice hockey season
2010–11 Union Dutchwomen women's ice hockey season

References

External links
Official site

Union
Union Dutchwomen ice hockey seasons